The following is a list of works by Ray Bradbury.

Novels
 (1950) The Martian Chronicles –  Fix-up novel consisting of mostly previously published, loosely connected stories. 
 (1953) Fahrenheit 451
 (1957) Dandelion Wine –  Fix-up novel of mostly previously published, loosely connected stories.
 (1962) Something Wicked This Way Comes
 (1972) The Halloween Tree
 (1985) Death Is a Lonely Business
 (1990) A Graveyard for Lunatics
 (1992) Green Shadows, White Whale –  Fictionalized autobiographical reminiscences, portions of which had been previously published as individual stories.
 (2001) From the Dust Returned –  Fix-up novel of previously published, loosely connected stories.
(2002) Let's All Kill Constance
 (2006) Farewell Summer

Collections
In addition to these collections, many of Bradbury's short stories have been published in multi-author anthologies. Almost fifty additional Bradbury stories have never been collected anywhere after their initial publication in periodicals.

 (1947) Dark Carnival
 (1951) The Illustrated Man
 (1953) The Golden Apples of the Sun
 (1955) The October Country
 (1959) A Medicine for Melancholy
 (1959) The Day It Rained Forever
 (1962) The Small Assassin
 (1962) R is for Rocket
 (1964) The Machineries of Joy
 (1965) The Autumn People
 (1965) The Vintage Bradbury
 (1966) Tomorrow Midnight
 (1966) S is for Space
 (1966) Twice 22
 (1969) I Sing The Body Electric
 (1975) Ray Bradbury
 (1976) Long After Midnight
 (1978) The Mummies of Guanajuato
 (1979) The Fog Horn & Other Stories
 (1980) One Timeless Spring
 (1980) The Last Circus and the Electrocution
 (1980) The Stories of Ray Bradbury
 (1981) The Fog Horn and Other Stories
 (1983) Dinosaur Tales
 (1984) A Memory of Murder
 (1985) The Wonderful Death of Dudley Stone
 (1988) The Toynbee Convector
 (1990) Classic Stories 1
 (1990) Classic Stories 2
 (1991) The Parrot Who Met Papa
 (1991) Selected from Dark They Were, and Golden-Eyed
 (1996) Quicker Than The Eye
 (1997) Driving Blind
 (2001) Ray Bradbury Collected Short Stories
 (2001) The Playground
 (2002) One More for the Road
 (2003) Bradbury Stories: 100 of His Most Celebrated Tales
 (2003) Is That You, Herb?
 (2004) The Cat's Pajamas: Stories
 (2005) A Sound of Thunder and Other Stories
 (2007) The Dragon Who Ate His Tail
 (2007) Now and Forever: Somewhere a Band Is Playing & Leviathan '99
 (2007) Summer Morning, Summer Night
 (2009) Ray Bradbury Stories Volume 2
 (2009) We'll Always Have Paris: Stories
 (2010) A Pleasure To Burn
 (2010) The Lost Bradbury: Forgotten Tales of Ray Bradbury 
 (2011) The Collected Stories of Ray Bradbury: A Critical Edition – Volume 1, 1938–1943
 (2014) The Collected Stories of Ray Bradbury: A Critical Edition – Volume 2, 1943–1944
 (2020) Killer, Come Back to Me: The Crime Stories of Ray Bradbury (2020)

Anthologies
Bradbury edited these collections of works by other authors
 (1952) Timeless Stories for Today and Tomorrow
 (1956) The Circus of Dr. Lao and Other Improbable Stories

Short stories

Bradbury has written over 400 novelettes and short stories. 

 (1938) "Hollerbochen's Dilemma"
 (1938) "Hollerbochen Comes Back"
 (1939) "Don't Get Technatal"
 (1939) "Gold"
 (1939) "The Pendulum"
 (1940) "The Maiden of Jirbu" (with Bob Tucker)
 (1940) "Tale of the Tortletwitch" (as Guy Amory)
 (1941) "The Trouble with Humans is People"
 (1941) "Pendulum" (with Henry Hasse)"
 (1942) "The Candle"
 (1943) "The Scythe"
 (1944) "The Lake"
 (1945) "The Watchers"
 (1945) "The Big Black and White Game"
 (1945) "Invisible Boy"
 (1946) "Frost and Fire"
 (1946) "The Traveller"
 (1946) "Homecoming"
 (1946) "The Million Year Picnic"
 (1947) "I See You Never"
 (1947) "The Small Assassin"
 (1948) "Fever Dream"
 (1948) "The Fruit at the Bottom of the Bowl" (also published as "Touch and Go")
 (1948) "The Long Years"
 (1948) "Mars Is Heaven!"
 (1949) "The Exiles" (also published as "The Mad Wizards of Mars")
 (1949) "Dark They Were, and Golden-Eyed"
 (1949) "Holiday"
 (1949) "Marionettes, Inc."
 (1950) "August 2002: Night Meeting"
 (1950) "I'll Not Look For Wine"
 (1950) "The Rocket"
 (1950) "The Veldt"
 (1950) "There Will Come Soft Rains"
 (1950) "Ylla"
 (1951) "The Beast from 20,000 Fathoms" (also published as "The Fog Horn")
 (1951) "Embroidery"
 (1951) "The Fireman"
 (1951) "The Fog Horn"
 (1951) "Here There Be Tygers"
 (1951) "The Pedestrian"
 (1952) "The April Witch"
 (1952) "A Sound of Thunder"
 (1952) "The Wilderness"
 (1953) "The Flying Machine"
 (1953) "The Golden Kite, the Silver Wind"
 (1953) "Dandelion Wine"
 (1953) "The Meadow"
 (1953) "The Murderer"
 (1953) "Sun and Shadow"
 (1954) "All Summer in a Day"
 (1956) "The Sound of Summer Running" (also published as "Summer in the Air")
 (1958) "The Wonderful Ice Cream Suit" (also published as "The Magic White Suit")
 (1959) "The Dragon"
 (1959) "A Medicine for Melancholy"
 (1960) "The Best of All Possible Worlds"
 (1962) "The Machineries of Joy"
 (1963) "The Prehistoric Producer" (also published as "Tyrannosaurus Rex")
 (1964) "The Cold Wind and the Warm"
 (1964) "The One Who Waits"
 (1966) "The Man in the Rorschach Shirt"
 (1967) "The Lost City of Mars"
 (1978) "The Mummies of Guanajuato"
 (1969) "Downwind From Gettysburg'"
 (1979) "The Aqueduct"
 (1984) "Banshee"
 (1984) "The Toynbee Convector"
 (1994) "From the Dust Returned"
 (2003) "Is That You, Herb?"
 (2009) "Juggernaut"

Plays

 (1953) The Flying Machine: A One-Act Play for Three Men
 (1963) The Anthem Sprinters and Other Antics
 (1965) A Device Out of Time: A One-Act Play
 (1966) The Day It Rained Forever: A Comedy in One Act
 (1966) The Pedestrian: A Fantasy in One Act
 (1972) Leviathan '99: A Drama for the Stage
 (1972) The Wonderful Ice Cream Suit and Other Plays
 (1975) Pillar of Fire and Other Plays for Today, Tomorrow, and Beyond Tomorrow
 (1975) Kaleidoscope
 (1976) That Ghost, That Bride of Time: Excerpts from a Play-in-Progress Based on the Moby Dick Mythology and Dedicated to Herman Melville
 (1984) Forever and the Earth
 (1986) The Martian Chronicles
 (1986) The Wonderful Ice Cream Suit
 (1986) Fahrenheit 451
 (1988) Dandelion Wine
 (1988) To The Chicago Abyss
 (1988) The Veldt
 (1988) Falling Upward
 (1990) The Day It Rained Forever
 (1991) Ray Bradbury on Stage: A Chrestomathy of His Plays
 (2010) Wisdom 2116 (US) or Ray Bradbury's 2116 The Musical (UK)

Screenplays, teleplays and radio adaptations

 (1953) It Came from Outer Space (original treatment)
 (1956) Moby Dick
 Jane Wyman Presents The Fireside Theatre
 (1956) "The Bullet Trick" / "The Marked Bullet"
 Alfred Hitchcock Presents
 (1956) "Shopping for Death"
 (1958) "Design for Loving"
 (1959) "Special Delivery"
 (1962) "The Faith of Aaron Menefee" (from the story by Stanley Ellin)
 Steve Canyon
 (1959) "The Gift"
 Trouble Shooters
 (1959) "The Tunnel to Yesterday"
 (1961) King of Kings (narration, uncredited)
 The Twilight Zone (1959)
 (1962) "I Sing the Body Electric"
 Alcoa Premiere
 (1962) "The Jail"
 (1962) Icarus Montgolfier Wright
 (1963) Dial Double Zero (The Story of a Writer)
 The Alfred Hitchcock Hour
 (1964) "The Life Work of Juan Diaz"
 (1969) The Picasso Summer
 (1969) The Illustrated Man
 Curiosity Shop
 (1971) "The Groon"
 (1979) Gnomes (screenplay)
 (1980) The Martian Chronicles
 (1982) The Electric Grandmother
 (1983) Something Wicked This Way Comes
 (1983–84) Bradbury 13 (radio series)
 (1983) Quest
 (1985–92) The Ray Bradbury Theater
 The Twilight Zone (1985)
 (1986) "The Elevator"
 (1992) Little Nemo: Adventures in Slumberland (story concept)
 (1993) The Halloween Tree
 (1997) Dandelion Wine
 (1998) The Wonderful Ice Cream Suit
 (2005) A Sound of Thunder
 (2008) Ray Bradbury's Chrysalis
 (2015) The Whispers

Children's literature
 (1955) Switch on the Night
 (1982) The Other Foot
 (1982) The Veldt
 (1987) The April Witch
 (1987) The Fog Horn
 (1987) Fever Dream
 (1991) The Smile
 (1992) The Toynbee Convector
 (1997) With Cat for Comforter
 (1997) Dogs Think That Every Day Is Christmas
 (1998) Ahmed and the Oblivion Machines: A Fable
 (2006) The Homecoming

Audio releases

 (1958) The Martian Chronicles (8 LPs)
 (1962) Burgess Meredith Reads Ray Bradbury (LP)
 (1963) Sum and Substance (LP)
 (1967) The Martian Chronicles (5 LPs)
 (1969) Teaching Guide – "The Smile" (LP)
 (1971) Christus Apollo (LP)
 (1973) Dimension X (cassette)
 (1974) Three Classic Stories (cassette)
 (1975) The Martian Chronicles: There Will Come Soft Rains and Usher II (LP)
 (1975) The Illustrated Man (2 cassettes)
 (1976) The Illustrated Man: The Veldt and Marionettes, Inc. (LP/cassette)
 (1976) The Martian Chronicles and The Illustrated Man (cassette)
 (1977) The Martian Chronicles (2 cassettes)
 (1977) Science Fiction Soundbook (cassette)
 (1979) The Ray Bradbury Cassette Library (6 cassettes)
 (1979) The Martian Chronicles: There Will Come Soft Rains and Usher II (cassette)
 (1980) Long After Midnight (cassette)
 (1980) Our Lady Queen of the Angels: A Celebrational Environment (cassette)
 (1982) Fahrenheit 451 (cassette)
 (1984) A Sound of Thunder/The Screaming Woman (cassette)
 (1984) Bradbury 13 (cassette series)
 (1985) The Martian Chronicles (2 cassettes)
 (1985) Ray Bradbury Himself: Reads 19 Complete Stories (4 cassettes)
 (1986) The Martian Chronicles (6 cassettes)
 (1986) Fantastic Tales of Ray Bradbury (6 cassettes)
 (1986) The Stories of Ray Bradbury (2 cassettes)
 (1986) Ray Bradbury (cassette)
 (1986) Night Call, Collect/The Ravine (cassette)
 (1986) The Veldt/There Was An Old Woman (cassette)
 (1986) The Wind/Dark They Were and Golden Eyed (cassette)
 (1986) The Man: Interview With Ray Bradbury (cassette)
 (1986) Kaleidoscope/Here There Be Tygers (cassette)
 (1986) The Fox and the Forest/The Happiness Machine (cassette)
 (1987) The Martian Chronicles (cassette)
 (1987) Ray Bradbury (cassette)
 (1987) Dandelion Wine (cassette)
 (1988) Fahrenheit 451 (cassette/CD)
 (1988) The Illustrated Man (cassette/CD)
 (1988) Omni Audio Experience I (cassette)
 (1988) The Golden Apples of the Sun (cassette/CD)
 (1989) Death and the Compass/The Playground (cassette)
 (1989) The Toynbee Convector (cassette)
 (1989) Death and The Compass and The Playground – with Jorge Luis Borges (cassette)
 (1990) I Sing The Body Electric (cassette/CD)
 (1990) The October Country (cassette/CD)
 (1990) Death is a Lonely Business (cassette/CD)
 (1990) Long after Midnight/The Halloween Tree (cassette/CD)
 (1991) Journeys Through Time and Space (cassette)
 (1991) Ray Bradbury: Tales of Fantasy (2 cassettes)
 (1991) Ray Bradbury (cassette)
 (1991) Fahrenheit 451 (cassette)
 (1991) The Martian Chronicles (cassette)
 (1991) Nathaniel Hawthorne Read by Ray Bradbury (cassette)
 (1992) A Sound of Thunder (cassette)
 (1992) Kaleidoscope and There Was An Old Woman (cassette)
 (1992) Green Shadows, White Whale (2 cassettes)
 (1992) Ray Bradbury Himself: Reads 19 Complete Stories (4 cassettes)
 (1993) William Shatner and Leonard Nimoy Read Four Science Fiction Classics (4 cassettes)
 (1994) Dark They Were and Golden Eyed (cassette)
 (1994) The Ravine and Here There Be Tygers (cassette)
 (1994) The Man and The Happiness Machine (cassette)
 (1994) The Illustrated Man (cassette)
 (1994) The Wind and The Veldt (cassette)
 (1994) Vanishing Point: Radio Dramas from the Fourth Dimension (cassette)
 (1995) Fahrenheit 451 (cassette)
 (1995) We Hold These Truths (CD)
 (1996) The October Country (cassette)
 (1996) Long After Midnight and The Halloween Tree (cassette)
 (1996) I Sing The Body Electric (cassette)
 (1996) Kaleidoscope/The Human Operators (cassette)
 (1997) Something Wicked this Way Comes (6 cassettes)
 (1997) The Martian Chronicles (cassette)
 (1998) Ray Bradbury: Science Fiction (cassette)
 (1999) The Ray Bradbury Theater (cassette)
 (1999) The Science Fiction Theater (cassette)
 (1997) Something Wicked this Way Comes (6 cassettes)
 (2000) Science Fiction on Old Time Radio (cassette/CD)
 (2001) Fahrenheit 451 (cassette/CD)
 (2001) From the Dust Returned: A Family Remembrance (cassette)
 (2001) Dark Carnival (CD)
 (2001) The 60 Greatest Old Time Radio Shows from Science Fiction: Selected by Ray Bradbury (cassette/CD)
 (2002) The Illustrated Man (CD/cassette)
 (2002) One More for the Road: A New Story Collection (cassette)
 (2002) 2000X: Tales of the Next Millennia (cassette/CD)
 (2002) Christus Apollo (CD)
 (2003) The War of The Worlds (CD)
 (2004) The Greatest Science Fiction Shows (CD)
 (2006) Fahrenheit 451 (3 CDs)
 (2006) Farewell Summer (CD)
 (2007) Now and Forever (cassette/CD)
 (2007) Dandelion Wine (CD)
 (2007) Something Wicked This Way Comes (CD)
 (2008) Live Radio Theatre From the International Mystery Writers' Festival (CD)
 (2008) Selected Shorts: Readers and Writers (CD)
 (2009) We'll Always Have Paris (CD)
 (2010) Bradbury 13 (CD)

Non-fiction
 (1952) No Man Is an Island
 (1962) The Essence of Creative Writing: Letters to a Young Aspiring Author
 (1967) Creative Man Among His Servant Machines
 (1971) Mars and the Mind of Man
 (1978) The God in Science Fiction
 (1979) About Norman Corwin
 (1981) There is Life on Mars
 (1985) The Art of Playboy
 (1990) Zen in the Art of Writing
 (1991) Yestermorrow: Obvious Answers to Impossible Futures
 (2004) Conversations with Ray Bradbury (ed. Steven L. Aggelis)
 (2005) Bradbury Speaks: Too Soon from the Cave, Too Far from the Stars
 (2007) Match to Flame: The Fictional Paths to Fahrenheit 451

Miscellaneous

 (1977) Where Robot Mice & Robot Men Run Round in Robot Towns
 (1979) To Sing Strange Songs
 (1979) Beyond 1984: Remembrance of Things Future
 (1980) The Ghosts of Forever
 (1982) The Complete Poems of Ray Bradbury
 (1982) The Love Affair
 (1985) Long After Ecclesiastes: New Biblical Texts
 (1998) Christus Apollo: Cantata Celebrating the Eighth Day of Creation and the Promise of the Ninth
 (2000) Witness and Celebrate
 (2001) A Chapbook for Burnt-Out Priests, Rabbis and Ministers
 (2001) Dark Carnival (limited edition with supplemental materials)
 (2002) I Live By the Invisible: New & Selected Poems
 (2003) The Best of The Ray Bradbury Chronicles
 (2003) The Best of Ray Bradbury: The Graphic Novel
 (2003) It Came from Outer Space (screenplay and related materials)
 (2005) The Halloween Tree, limited lettered and numbered edition which includes the novel, screenplay, variant texts, and related materials
 (2007) Futuria Fantasia
 (2007) Somewhere a Band is Playing: Early Drafts and Final Novella

References

External links
 
 
 
 

Bibliographies by writer
Bibliographies of American writers

Science fiction bibliographies